Garrett W. Arbelbide (September 5, 1909 – July 24, 1983) was an American football and baseball player and football coach.

A native of San Bernardino County, California, he grew up in Redlands and played college football at the end position for the USC Trojans football team from 1929 to 1931.  He was selected by the Newspaper Enterprise Association and the New York Evening Post as a first-team end on the 1930 College Football All-America Team.  He was also selected as a second-team All-American by the Associated Press.  He also played on the 1931 USC Trojans football team that won a national championship.

Arbelbide also played college baseball at USC from 1930 to 1932 and professional baseball as an outfielder for the Hollywood Stars of the Pacific Coast League in 1933. He served as the head football coach at La Verne College—now known as the University of La Verne—in 1935 and at Arizona State Teachers College at Flagstaff—now known as Northern Arizona University—from 1936 to 1939.

Arbelbide also served in the United States army during the World War II era, and worked as a teacher and rancher. He was married to Fern Arbelbide and had three children (Garrett Lea, Janice and Cindy Lea) and lived in Bakersfield, Santa Barbara, Lodi and Pioneer, California, in his later years. He died in a Sacramento hospital in 1983 at age 72. He was posthumously inducted into the USC Hall of Fame in 1999.

Head coaching record

College football

References

1909 births
1983 deaths
La Verne Leopards football coaches
Northern Arizona Lumberjacks football coaches
Junior college football coaches in the United States
Junior college baseball coaches in the United States
Junior college men's basketball coaches in the United States
American football ends
Players of American football from California
Baseball first basemen
Baseball outfielders
Hollywood Stars players
Baseball players from California
Educators from California
Farmers from California
USC Trojans baseball players
USC Trojans football players
People from Redlands, California
United States Army soldiers